Charles James Box Jr. (born 1958) is an American author of more than thirty novels. Box is the author of the Joe Pickett series, as well as several stand-alone novels, and a collection of short stories. The novels have been translated into 27 languages. Over ten million copies of his novels have been sold in the U.S. alone. The first novel in his Joe Pickett series, Open Season, was included in The New York Times list of "Notable Books" of 2001. Open Season, Blue Heaven, Nowhere to Run, and The Highway have been optioned for film and television, the latter being adapted into the television drama series Big Sky, which debuted in November 2020. In March 2016, Off the Grid debuted at #1 on The New York Times Best Seller list. In 2021, Paramount Television Studios began production of a ten episode television adaption of Box's Joe Pickett novels, featuring actor Michael Dorman as Joe Pickett, to air exclusively on the Spectrum cable television service in the U.S. The subsequent series was renewed for a second season in February 2022.

Personal life and education 
Box is a Wyoming native and currently lives in the state. He grew up in the city of Casper. Box graduated with a degree in Mass Communications from the University of Denver. Box enjoys fishing, golfing, and outdoor activities.

Awards
 For Open Season, Box won the Anthony Award, the Macavity Award, the Gumshoe Award, and the Barry Award, all in the Best First Novel category.
 Prix Calibre 38 Award (France)
 Blue Heaven, his first stand-alone novel, won the Edgar Award for Best Mystery Novel of 2008.
2008 "BIG WYO" Award from Wyoming Tourism
 2010 Mountains & Plains Independent Booksellers Association Award
 2016 Western Heritage Award for Literature by the National Cowboy Museum
2021 Falcon Award for Breaking Point

Bibliography

Joe Pickett novels
 Open Season (Putnam, July 2001)    
 Savage Run (Putnam, June 2002)    
 Winterkill (Putnam, May 2003)    
 Trophy Hunt (Putnam, June 2004)    
 Out of Range (Putnam, May 2005)    
 In Plain Sight (Putnam, May 2006)    
 Free Fire (Putnam, May 2007)   
 Blood Trail (Putnam, May 2008)   
 Below Zero (Putnam, June 2009)    
 Nowhere to Run (Putnam, April 2010)    
 Cold Wind (Putnam, March 2011)    
 Force of Nature (Putnam, March 2012)    
 Breaking Point (Putnam, March 2013)    
 Stone Cold (Putnam, March 2014)    
 Endangered (Putnam, March 2015)   
 Off the Grid (Putnam, March 2016)   
 Vicious Circle (Putnam, March 2017) 
 The Disappeared (Putnam, March 2018) 
 Wolf Pack (Putnam, March 2019) 
 Long Range (Putnam, March 2020) 
 Dark Sky (Putnam, March 2021) 
 Shadows Reel (Putnam, March 2022)
 Storm Watch (Putnam, February 2023)

Cody Hoyt / Cassie Dewell novels
 Back of Beyond (St. Martin's Minotaur, August 2011) 
 The Highway (St. Martin's Minotaur, July 2013) 
 Badlands (St. Martin's Minotaur, July 2015) 
 Paradise Valley (St. Martin's Minotaur, July 2017) 
 The Bitterroots (St. Martin's Minotaur, August 2019) 
 Treasure State (St. Martin's Minotaur, September 2022)

Stand-alone novels
 Blue Heaven (St. Martin's Minotaur, January 2008) 
 Three Weeks to Say Goodbye (St. Martin's Minotaur, January 2009) 
 Pronghorns of the Third Reich (Head of Zeus, April 2014)

Short stories
 Shots Fired: Stories from Joe Pickett Country (Putnam, July 2014) 
(Included in Shots Fired)
 Dull Knife (2005) ("A Joe Pickett Story")
 The Master Falconer (2006)
 Le Sauvage Noble (2007)

Adaptations
Big Sky (2020–present) (Television series for the ABC network, adapted from the Cassie Dewell novels)
Joe Pickett (2021–present) (Television series for the Spectrum network, adapted from the Joe Pickett novels)

References

External links 
C. J. Box's website
2011 Interview in Shotsmag Ezine - "In the Spotlight"
Reader's Digest Select Editions interview.
C. J. Box papers at the University of Wyoming – American Heritage Center
Profile on the Macmillan Speakers Bureau website
Joe Pickett television series website

American crime writers
Edgar Award winners
Writers from Wyoming
Living people
Anthony Award winners
Macavity Award winners
Barry Award winners
1958 births
Maltese Falcon Award winners